Genie Records is a Thai record label and a subsidiary of GMM Grammy that focuses on rock music genre.

History 
Genie Records was formed on 1 January 1998 through GMM Grammy and appointed Wichian Rerkpaisan to be its pioneering managing director. The record label initially produced several acts which covered a variety of music genres, one of which was Sumet and the Pang, a musical duo who became popular with their first album.

The rock band Big Ass, who was previously with the record label Music Bugs, became part of Genie Records in 2004. It was followed by the new pop-rock band Bodyslam who also came from the same record label. Both bands later released their respective albums, "Seven" by Big Ass and "Believe" by Bodyslam which topped the music charts at that time.

Around 2012, the record label was rebranded into "genie rock" to focus primarily on producing music in the rock genre.

They held their first major concert "Genie Fest G16" on 10 May 2014 at IMPACT Muang Thong Thani celebrating Genie Records' 16th founding anniversary and was followed by "Genie Fest G19" held on 10 February 2018 at Rajamangala National Stadium.

On 1 July 2019, its founder and managing director Wichian Rerkpaisan, who also goes by the name of "Nick Genie", confirmed in a Facebook post that he was ending his role in Genie Records after his contract with GMM Grammy expired. He later expounded in an interview after leaving Genie Records that he was initially disappointed with the abrupt decision since he already considered it as his home but made it clear that he respected the decision.

Roster

Current acts

Soloists 
  (Pang)
  (Num Kala)
  (Pala Phon)
  (Kwang AB Normal)
  (Pun Basher)
 Uefa Hari
 Tippsy
 Joey Phuwasit
 Boy Peacemaker
 Kwang AB
 The White Hair Cut

Bands 
 Paradox
 Big Ass
 
 Potato
 Bodyslam
 
 
 
 
 
 
 Paper Planes
 
 The Whitest Crow
 Bomb at Track
 Clockwork Motionless
 Lingrom
 Fool Step
 Wallrollers
 To people
 New Travelers

Past 

  (Pang)
 Palmy
 
 Fukfang

Concerts

Controversies 
He acknowledged the violation and was released on bail after a surety of ฿100,000. In the same month, the band Big Ass was also charged with piracy by Music Bugs, which was their previous record label, for performing the song "Gorn Tai" ("Before I Die") which they released in 2000.

References

External links 

GMM Grammy
Thai record labels
Rock record labels
1998 establishments in Thailand